Ro-51, originally named Submarine No. 25, was an Imperial Japanese Navy Type L submarine of the L1 subclass. She was in commission from 1920 to 1938.

Design and description
The submarines of the Type L1 sub-class were copies of the Group 1 subclass of the British L-class submarine built under license in Japan with technical supervision by the British firm Vickers. The Imperial Japanese Navy procured them in order to acquire advanced British submarine technology, as well as the highly reliable Vickers diesel engines that powered the Type L1 submarines. They displaced  surfaced and  submerged.

For surface running, the submarines were powered by two  Vickers diesel engines, each driving one propeller shaft. When submerged each propeller was driven by an  electric motor. They could reach  on the surface and  underwater.

The submarines were armed with six internal  torpedo tubes — four in the bow and two mounted athwartships and firing on the broadside — and carried a total of ten Type 44 torpedoes. They were also armed with a single  gun deck gun.

Construction and commissioning

Ro-51 was laid down as Submarine No. 25 on 10 August 1918 by Mitsubishi at Kobe, Japan. Launched on 25 October 1919, she was completed and commissioned on 30 June 1920.

Service history

Upon commissioning, Submarine No. 25 was attached to the Yokosuka Naval District. On 30 November 1920, she was reassigned to Submarine Division 3, which in turn was assigned to Submarine Squadron 1 in the 1st Fleet on 1 December 1920. Submarine Division 3 was reattached to the Yokosuka Naval District on 1 December 1921 and was assigned that day to the Yokosuka Defense Division, then was reassigned on 1 June 1922 to the Ominato Defense Division.

On 1 December 1922, Submarine No. 25 was attached to the Kure Naval District and reassigned to Submarine Division 11, in both of which she remained for the rest of her active career. During the years that followed, Submarine No. 25 was assigned to the Kure Defense Division from 1 December 1922 to 1 December 1923, was renamed Ro-51 on 1 November 1924, and had additional Kure Defense Division assignments from 1 December 1926 to 10 December 1928, from 30 November 1929 to 15 October 1931, and from 1 December 1932 to 8 October 1935. On 9 April 1938 she and her division mate  got underway from Sasebo, Japan, for a training cruise in southern Chinese waters, which they concluded with their arrival at Kīrun, Formosa, on 14 April 1938.

Ro-51 was decommissioned and placed in the Fourth Reserve in the Kure Naval District on 15 December 1938. The Japanese struck her from the Navy list on 1 April 1940, and that day she became a stationary hulk with the name Haisen No. 10.

Notes

Bibliography
, History of Pacific War Extra, "Perfect guide, The submarines of the Imperial Japanese Forces", Gakken (Japan), March 2005, 
The Maru Special, Japanese Naval Vessels No.43 Japanese Submarines III, Ushio Shobō (Japan), September 1980, Book code 68343-44
The Maru Special, Japanese Naval Vessels No.132 Japanese Submarines I "Revised edition", Ushio Shobō (Japan), February 1988, Book code 68344-36
The Maru Special, Japanese Naval Vessels No.133 Japanese Submarines II "Revised edition", Ushio Shobō (Japan), March 1988, Book code 68344-37

Ro-51-class submarines
Japanese L type submarines
Ships built by Mitsubishi Heavy Industries
1919 ships